The 2010–11 Davidson Wildcats men's basketball team represented Davidson College in the 2010–11 NCAA Division I men's basketball season. The Wildcats, led by head coach Bob McKillop, played their home games at John M. Belk Arena in Davidson, North Carolina, as members of the Southern Conference.

Davidson failed to qualify for the NCAA tournament, but were invited to the 2011 College Basketball Invitational. The Wildcats won their first game in the tournament, but were eliminated in the quarterfinals of the CBI in a loss to Creighton, 102–92.

Roster 

Source

Schedule and results

|-
!colspan=9 style=|Exhibition

|-
!colspan=9 style=|Regular season

|-
!colspan=9 style=| SoCon tournament

|-
!colspan=9 style=| CBI

Source

References

Davidson Wildcats men's basketball seasons
Davidson
Davidson
Davidson men's basketball
Davidson men's basketball